
The following lists events that happened during 1851 in South Africa.

Events
 Xhosas clash with the white settlers on the Cape Colonys eastern boundary starting the 8th Cape Frontier War and ends in 1853 in South Africa
 Sugar is first produced from cane in Natal

Deaths
 27 August - John Philip, a London Missionary Society's missionary to South Africa, dies at age of 76 at Hankey in the Cape Colony

References
See Years in South Africa for list of References

Years in South Africa